Urs Rechn is a German actor, most famous for his appearance in the 2015 Cannes Grand Prix-winning Holocaust drama Son of Saul.

Biography 
Urs Günther Rechn was born on January 18, 1978, in Halle an der Saale, then German Democratic Republic, now Saxony-Anhalt, Germany, to Günther Rechn (a renowned painter and graphic artist from East Germany) and his wife Beate Rechn, the second of their three children.

From 1987 onwards, Rechn attended the Special Grammar School for Music "Felix Mendelssohn Bartholdy" in Halle, where he excelled in violoncello, French horn, and singing. After the Fall of the Berlin Wall, the family relocated to Cottbus, Brandenburg, where Rechn attended the 1. Heinrich Heine Academic High School for Music and Fine Arts and the Konservatorium Cottbus, where he gained an outstanding reputation as junior conductor of the youth symphony orchestra and brass band.

Despite having received no formal previous training in acting, Rechn segued into an acting career, encouraged by the honoured and renowned East German director and impresario Christoph Schroth. He appeared on the stage plays Hamlet (1995), The Beaver Coat (1996), and Steig'in das Traumboot der Liebe (1996) and as a chorister in the opera The Magic Flute (1995) at the State Theater Cottbus.

In 1997, owing to conscription, Rechn served with the German paratrooper corps, and later in the German special forces. In the meantime, he appeared in several TV episodes thanks to an agreement with his colonel. Upon completion of the active service in 2002, Rechn attended the University of Music and Theater Felix Mendelssohn Bartholdy, Leipzig, and graduated in 2004. He became then – and still is – a visiting scholar at this institution.

Rechn has spent most of his acting career on stage: 2003-2005 Staatsschauspiel Dresden, 2005-2007 Landestheater Tübingen, 2008-2013 Theater Chemnitz, (Chemnitz Opera) e.g.: The Seagull - Treblev; Cat on a Hot Tin Roof - Brick; The Merchant of Venice - Antonio; Julius Caesar - Marcus Antonius; Caligula - Caligula; A Streetcar Named Desire - Stanley Kowalski; The Threepenny Opera - Jonathan Peachum.

Rechn attracted international attention for his role of the Jewish Oberkapo Biedermann in the film Son of Saul by Hungarian director László Nemes which won the Grand Prix at the 2015 Cannes Film Festival as well as several further international awards. In June 2015, Hungary announced its submission of Son of Saul as their candidate for the foreign language film Oscar at the 2016 Academy Awards. On February 28, Son of Saul won the Oscar.

Filmography

TV (selection) 
 1999: Die Strandclique – Dir.: Wolfgang Münstermann
 2000: Powderpark – Dir.: Christian Stier
 2001: Klinikum Berlin Mitte – Dir.: Ullrich Zrenner
 2002: Our Charly – Dir.: Franz Josef Gottlieb
 2003: Die Kommissarin (Lady Cop) – Dir.: Rolf Liccini
 2007: GSG 9 (Special Unit) – Dir.: Florian Kern
 2003: Der Ermittler: Stadt, Land, Mord, ZDF
 2004: , TV movie
 2005: Tatort – Freischwimmer, ARD (MDR)
 2015: Polizeiruf 110 – Im Schatten, ARD (MDR)
 2016: X Company, "Black Flag", CBC Television, Dir.: Kelly Makin
 2018: Dogs of Berlin – Netflix, Dir.: Christian Alvart

Cinema (selection) 
 2003: Broad Hit, Dir.: Gennadi Poloka, RUS
 2004: Juraan, Dir.: Andrej Kudinenko, RUS
 2006: Eight Miles High, Dir.: Achim Bornhak, GER
 2013: Run Boy Run, Dir.: Pepe Danquart, GER
 2014: The King's Surrender, Dir.: Philipp Leinemann, GER
 2015: Son of Saul, Dir.: László Nemes, HUN
 2019: Inside Man: Most Wanted, Dir.: Michael J. Bassett, USA
 2020: Waiting for Anya, Dir.: Ben Cookson, UK, BEL

Roles on stage since 2003 (selection) 
Staatsschauspiel Dresden, Landestheater Tübingen, Schauspiel Chemnitz Chemnitz Opera
 Man Equals Man (Galy Gay) Bertolt Brecht, Dir.: Küf Kaufmann
 The Broken Jug (Adam) Heinrich von Kleist, Dir.: Rudolf Donath
 The Seagull (Treblev) Anton Tchechov, Dir.: Tom Quaas
 The Merchant of Venice (Antonio) William Shakespeare, Dir: Holk Freitag
 Caligula (Caligula) Albert Camus, Dir: Rudolf Donath
 Draussen vor der Tür (Beckmann) Wolfgang Borchert, Dir: Mario Grünewald
 Downfall of the Egotist Johann Fatzer (Koch) Bertolt Brecht/Heiner Müller, Dir.: Tim Grobe
 Cat on a Hot Tin Roof (Brick) Tennessee Williams, Dir.. Holk Freitag
 Julius Caesar (Marcus Antonius) William Shakespeare, Dir.: Rainer Flath
 Mamma Medea (Jason) Tom Lanoye, Dir.: Simone Sterr
 The Good Person of Szechwan (Yang Ssun) Bertolt Brecht, Dir.: Ralf Siebelt
 A Report to an Academy (Red Peter) Franz Kafka, Dir.: Urs Rechn
 The Prisoner's Dilemma, David Edgar, Dir.: Clemens Bechtel
 Iphigenie auf Tauris (Orest) Johann Wolfgang von Goethe, Dir.: Alexander Nerlich
 Innocence (Elisio) von Dea Loher, Dir: Tomas Krupa
 A Streetcar Named Desire (Stanley Kowalski), Tennessee Williams, Dir.: Enrico Lübbe
 A Report to an Academy (Red Peter) Franz Kafka, Dir.: Mario Grünewald, Urs Rechn
 The Snow Queen (Märchenerzähler / Rabe / Räuber), Hans Christian Andersen/Jewgenij Schwarz
 Amphitryon (Amphitryon), Heinrich von Kleist, Dir.: Kay Neumann
 The Threepenny Opera (Peachum), Bertolt Brecht, Dir.: Philip Tiedemann

Awards 
 2016 Oscar at the Academy Awards for Son of Saul
 2015 Grand Prix (Cannes Film Festival) 2015 for Son of Saul
 2015 International Federation of Film Critics FIPRESCI Prize 2015 for Son of Saul
 2015 Prix Vulcain de l’Artiste Technicien/ Vulcan Award for Son of Saul
 2015 Prix François Chalais /François Chalais Prize for Son of Saul
 2013 Brüder-Grimm-Preis des Landes Berlin for Reiher, Schauspiel Chemnitz

References

External links 
 Website of Urs Rechn
 
 "Son of Saul" on indiewire.com
 Portrait of Urs Rechn (German
 Portrait of Urs Rechn (German)
 Portrait of Urs Rechn (German)

1978 births
Living people
20th-century German male actors
21st-century German male actors
German male film actors
People from Halle (Saale)